Anthelme Voituret (1618–1683) was a French Carthusian monk and astronomer.

Life
He was born in Châtenay, France in 1618. and died in 1683.

Career 
He was able to devote considerable time in the observation of comets and variable stars.

He discovered several comets and investigated the cause of the brightness change of the variable star Mira.
He is credited with being the first to observe the Nova 1670 Vulpeculae, the first ordinary nova discovered in modern times.

Bibliography 

In 1681, he published the book Explication de la comete.

References

External links 

Carthusians
1618 births
1683 deaths
17th-century French astronomers